In monetary economics, a money multiplier is one of various closely related ratios of commercial bank money to central bank money (also called the monetary base) under a fractional-reserve banking system. It relates to the maximum amount of commercial bank money that can be created, given a certain amount of central bank money.  In a fractional-reserve banking system that has legal reserve requirements, the total amount of loans that commercial banks are allowed to extend (the commercial bank money that they can legally create) is equal to a multiple of the amount of reserves. This multiple is the reciprocal of the reserve ratio minus one, and it is an economic multiplier. The actual ratio of money to central bank money, also called the money multiplier, is lower because some funds are held by the non-bank public as currency. Also, banks may hold excess reserves, being reserves above the reserve requirement set by the central bank.

Although the money multiplier concept is a traditional portrayal of fractional-reserve banking, it has been criticized as being  misleading. The Federal Reserve, Bank of England, Deutsche Bundesbank, and the Standard & Poor's rating agency have issued criticisms of the concept's use. Several countries (such as Canada, the UK, Australia and Sweden) set no legal reserve requirements. Even in those countries that do, the reserve requirement is as a ratio to deposits held, not a ratio to loans that can be extended. Basel III does stipulate a liquidity requirement to cover 30 days net cash outflow expected under a modeled stressed scenario (note this is not a ratio to loans that can be extended); however, liquidity coverage does not need to be held as reserves but rather as any high-quality liquid assets.

In equations, writing M for commercial bank money (loans), R for reserves (central bank money), and RR for the reserve ratio, the reserve ratio requirement is that  the fraction of reserves must be at least the reserve ratio. Taking the reciprocal,  which yields  meaning that commercial bank money is at most reserves times  the latter being the multiplier. (In March 2020, the minimum reserve requirement for all deposit institutions in the United States was abolished, setting RR=0. In practice, however, banks continue to be limited by their capital requirement.)

If banks lend out close to the maximum allowed by their reserves, then the inequality becomes an approximate equality, and commercial bank money is central bank money times the multiplier. If banks instead lend less than the maximum, accumulating excess reserves, then commercial bank money will be less than central bank money times the theoretical multiplier.

In the United States since 1959, banks lent out close to the maximum allowed for the 49-year period from 1959 until August 2008, maintaining a low level of excess reserves, then accumulated significant excess reserves over the period September 2008 through the present (November 2009). Thus, in the first period, commercial bank money was almost exactly central bank money times the multiplier, but this relationship ceased in September 2008.

Definition 
The money multiplier is defined in various ways. Most simply, it can be defined either as the statistic of "commercial bank money"/"central bank money", based on the actual observed quantities of various empirical measures of money supply, such as M2 (broad money) over M0 (base money), or it can be the theoretical "maximum commercial bank money/central bank money" ratio, defined as the reciprocal of the reserve ratio,  The multiplier in the first (statistic) sense fluctuates continuously based on changes in commercial bank money and central bank money (though it is at most the theoretical multiplier), while the multiplier in the second (legal) sense depends only on the reserve ratio, and thus does not change unless the law changes.

For purposes of monetary policy, what is of most interest is the predicted impact of changes in central bank money on commercial bank money, and in various models of monetary creation, the associated multiple (the ratio of these two changes) is called the money multiplier (associated to that model). For example, if one assumes that people hold a constant fraction of deposits as cash, one may add a "currency drain" variable (currency–deposit ratio), and obtain a multiplier of 

These concepts are not generally distinguished by different names; if one wishes to distinguish them, one may gloss them by names such as empirical (or observed) multiplier, legal (or theoretical) multiplier, or model multiplier, but these are not standard usages.

Similarly, one may distinguish the observed reserve–deposit ratio from the legal (minimum) reserve ratio, and the observed currency–deposit ratio from an assumed model one. Note that in this case the reserve–deposit ratio and currency–deposit ratio are outputs of observations, and fluctuate over time. If one then uses these observed ratios as model parameters (inputs) for the predictions of effects of monetary policy and assumes that they remain constant, computing a constant multiplier, the resulting predictions are valid only if these ratios do not in fact change. Sometimes this holds, and sometimes it does not; for example, increases in central bank money may result in increases in commercial bank money – and will, if these ratios (and thus multiplier) stay constant – or may result in increases in excess reserves but little or no change in commercial bank money, in which case the reserve–deposit ratio will grow and the multiplier will fall.

Mechanism

There are two suggested mechanisms for how money creation occurs in a fractional-reserve banking system: either reserves are first injected by the central bank, and then lent on by the commercial banks, or loans are first extended by commercial banks, and then backed by reserves borrowed from the central bank. The "reserves first" model is that taught in mainstream economics textbooks, while the "loans first" model is advanced by endogenous money theorists.

Reserves first model
In the "reserves first" model of money creation, a given reserve is lent out by a bank, then deposited at a bank (possibly different), which is then lent out again, the process repeating and the ultimate result being a geometric series.

Formula
The money multiplier, is the inverse of the reserve requirement, :

General formula

To correct for currency drain (a lessening of the impact of monetary policy due to peoples' desire to hold some currency in the form of cash) and for banks' desire to hold reserves in excess of the required amount, the formula:

can be used, where "Currency Drain Ratio" is the ratio of cash to deposits, i.e. C/D, and the Desired Reserve Ratio is the sum of the Required Reserve Ratio and the Excess Reserve Ratio.

The desired reserve ratio is the amount of its assets that a bank chooses to hold as excess and required reserves; it is a decreasing function of the amount by which the market rate for loans to the non-bank public from banks exceeds the interest rate on excess reserves and of the amount by which the federal funds rate exceeds the interest rate on excess reserves. Since the money multiplier in turn depends negatively on the desired reserve ratio, the money multiplier depends positively on these two opportunity costs. Moreover, the public’s choice of the currency drain ratio depends negatively on market rates of return on highly liquid substitutes for currency; since the currency ratio negatively affects the money multiplier, the money multiplier is positively affected by the return on these substitutes.

The formula above is derived from the following procedure. Let the monetary base be normalized to unity. Define the legal reserve ratio, the excess reserves ratio, the currency drain ratio with respect to deposits, ; suppose the demand for funds is unlimited; then the theoretical superior limit for deposits is defined by the following series:
.

Analogously, the theoretical superior limit for the money held by public is defined by the following series:

and the theoretical superior limit for the total loans lent in the market is defined by the following series:

By summing up the two quantities, the theoretical money multiplier is defined as

where  and 

The process described above by the geometric series can be represented in the following table, where

loans at stage  are a function of the deposits at the preceding stage: 
publicly held money at stage  is a function of the deposits at the preceding stage: 
deposits at stage  are the difference between additional loans and publicly held money relative to the same stage:

Table 
This re-lending process (with no currency drain) can be depicted as follows, assuming a 20% reserve ratio and a $100 initial deposit:

Note that no matter how many times the smaller and smaller amounts of money are re-lended, the legal reserve requirement is never exceeded - because that would be illegal.

Loans first model 
In the alternative model of money creation, loans are first extended by commercial banks – say, $1,000 of loans (following the example above), which may then require that the bank borrow $100 of reserves either from depositors (or other private sources of financing), or from the central bank. This view is advanced in endogenous money theories, such as the Post-Keynesian school of monetary circuit theory, as advanced by such economists as Basil Moore and Steve Keen.

Finn E. Kydland and Edward C. Prescott argue that there is no evidence that either the monetary base or M1 leads the cycle.

Jaromir Benes and Michael Kumhof of the IMF Research Department, argue that: the “deposit multiplier“ of the undergraduate economics textbook, where monetary aggregates are created at the initiative of the central bank, through an initial injection of high-powered money into the banking system that gets multiplied through bank lending, turns the actual operation of the monetary transmission mechanism on its head. At all times, when banks ask for reserves, the central bank obliges. According to this model, reserves therefore impose no constraint and the deposit multiplier is therefore a myth. The authors therefore argue that private banks are almost fully in control of the money creation process.

John Whittaker of Lancaster University Management School, describes two systems used by the Bank of England. In both systems, the central bank supplies reserves to meet demand.

Implications for monetary policy

According to the quantity theory of money, the multiplier plays a key role in monetary policy, and the distinction between the multiplier being the maximum amount of commercial bank money created by a given unit of central bank money and approximately equal to the amount created has important implications in monetary policy.

If banks maintain low levels of excess reserves, as they did in the US from 1959 to August 2008, then central banks can finely control broad (commercial bank) money supply by controlling central bank money creation, as the multiplier gives a direct and fixed connection between these.

If, on the other hand, banks accumulate excess reserves, as occurs in some financial crises such as the Great Depression and the Financial crisis of 2007–2010, then according to some economists this relationship breaks down and central banks can force the broad money supply to shrink, but not force it to grow:

Restated, increases in central bank money may not result in commercial bank money because the money is not required to be lent out – it may instead result in a growth of unlent reserves (excess reserves). This situation is referred to as "pushing on a string": withdrawal of central bank money compels commercial banks to curtail lending (one can pull money via this mechanism), but input of central bank money does not compel commercial banks to lend (one cannot push via this mechanism).

Following the introduction of interest rates on excess reserves, a large growth in excess reserves occurred in the Financial crisis of 2007–2010, US bank excess reserves growing over 500-fold, from under $2 billion in August 2008 to over $1,000 billion in November 2009.

References

Sources 

 
 
 
 
 

Monetary policy